Nicolas Portal (23 April 1979 – 3 March 2020) was a French directeur sportif and professional road bicycle racer. He was born in Auch, France.

He missed much of the 2009 season because of problems with cardiac arrhythmia and retired as a professional cyclist following the 2010 season. He stayed with his final professional team, Team Sky, as a manager from the 2011 season. Following the retirement of Sean Yates, Portal was appointed lead directeur sportif of Team Sky for 2013.

He died of a heart attack on 3 March 2020, aged 40.

Professional career

Portal was born on 23 April 1979 in Auch, France. His father was a quarry manager and his mother worked as a medical secretary. He started cycling as a mountain biker and was successful at youth and under-23 levels in the late 1990s, before switching to road cycling. Portal then turned professional with the team for 2002. He rode his first Grand Tour the same year at the Vuelta a España and then competed in the Tour de France for the first time in 2003. He would ride the Tour a further five times, always reaching the finish in Paris. His only professional victory came at the 2004 Critérium du Dauphiné Libéré, where he won stage 3 with a late attack on the final climb. While individual success was scarce, he established himself as one of the most reliable domestiques in the field. Portal was part of the team that saw Óscar Pereiro win the 2006 Tour de France, a race he finished even though he suffered a serious crash on stage 15. He was joined at Caisse d'Epargne by his brother Sébastien, also a cyclist, the following year.

Career as sports director
Although he could not speak English, Portal was hired by Dave Brailsford as directeur sportif for Team Sky following his retirement as a cyclist, with Brailsford attributing his decision to Portal's "human qualities". For 2013, following the departure of some of Team Sky's leading staff, Portal was promoted to lead sporting director. Under his guidance, Sky riders won six of the next seven editions of the Tour de France, as well as one Vuelta a España and a Giro d'Italia. These victories made Portal one of the most successful sporting directors in the history of cycling. In 2019, after guiding Egan Bernal to victory in the Tour, Portal became the first sporting director to win the race with three different riders since Cyrille Guimard in 1983, having previously won it with Chris Froome four times and Geraint Thomas once.

Death
Portal died suddenly from a heart attack, aged 40, at his home in Andorra on 3 March 2020. Following his death, his employer Ineos Grenadiers withdrew from all further races until 28 March, citing the "unique set of circumstances" of Portal's death and the coronavirus pandemic as reasons for the decision.

Major results

2003
 6th Grand Prix d'Ouverture La Marseillaise
2004
 1st Stage 3 Criterium du Dauphiné Libéré
 9th Overall Tour du Limousin
2005
 10th Overall Herald Sun Tour
2006
 7th Overall Four Days of Dunkirk

Source: ProCyclingStats

Grand Tour general classification results timeline

Source: ProCyclingStats

References

External links 

Official website 

1979 births
2020 deaths
French male cyclists
People from Auch
Directeur sportifs
Sportspeople from Gers
Cyclists from Occitania (administrative region)
Deaths in Andorra